5FM is a South African FM radio station that follows a Top 40 music format and is owned by the South African Broadcasting Corporation (SABC), South Africa's public broadcaster. SABC announced the appointment of Mr. JD Mostert as Business Manager of 5FM, as well as Good Hope FM, otherwise known as the PCS Combo (5FM and Good Hope FM) on March 11, 2021.

Origin and history 
Formerly known as "Radio 5", the station developed from a commercial station, LM Radio, which had been operating from Lourenço Marques (now Maputo) in neighbouring Mozambique. Radio 5 first went on the air on 13 October 1975 after Mozambique gained its independence. The station began broadcasting in the medium wave band from transmitters at Welgedacht, Maraisburg, Pietersburg, Durban, Bloemfontein, Brackenfell, Port Elizabeth and Grahamstown. The name indicated it was the SABC's fifth national radio channel at that time, after Radio Suid-Afrika, Radio South Africa, Springbok Radio and Radio Bantu.

Re-branded "5FM" in 1992, it has as its current logo a red "5" and superscripted "FM" within a circle and the words "The Power of" inscribed along the upper periphery of the circle.  Music is the heart of 5FM's format, supported by news, sports and traffic catering to a wide range of tastes for a youthful market.

History
Radio 5 launched on 13 October 1975 from the SABC Broadcast House in Commissioner Street and was later moved into the basement of the Broadcast Centre, Auckland Park in Johannesburg.

LM Radio, targeting South Africa's youth from Lourenço Marques in Mozambique had for years been a thorn in the side of the Calvinistic South African Government and its National Broadcaster, the SABC. When LM Radio was shut down by the Frelimo Government the South African Government instructed the SABC to take over the staff and the service.

This was not welcomed by the SABC. They promptly renamed the station Radio 5 and required it to be bilingual with an equal weighting of English and Afrikaans. Music was strictly monitored, controlled and censored. As a commercial radio station it was doomed.

The day after LM's closure, now ex-LM jock Nick Megans reported for duty and (as competently as possible under draconian conditions) presented the first live show on Radio 5 starting at 05:00 on 13 October 1975.

Competition was fierce. Channel 702 broadcasting from Bophuthatswana and Capital 604 in the Transkei were Radio 5's competition.  But this was not enough to change the attitude of the Calvinistic SABC. (Minister of Broadcasting, Albert Hertzog, referred to Radio 5 and the others as stations that played: "Die Duiwel se Musiek" (The Devil's Music).

Channel 702 was renamed Radio 702 and, on the advice of an American consultant, Bob Hennaberry, the music format changed to straight Top 40 with the introduction of new voices. The star to emerge was the highly talented John Berks (also ex LM) who they head-hunted from Radio 5. Within a year 702 claimed nearly a million listeners from the area then called the PWV while the nationwide Radio 5 could muster less than 150,000.

Rhodesian (now Zimbabwe) TV and Radio man Malcolm Russell was employed as the new Radio 5 Breakfast Show Host and used the time to plan a way forward against the powerful competition Radio 5 faced. Coincidentally there was a changing of the guard at the SABC. Riaan Eksteen was appointed Director General in 1984. When he learnt that the youth of the nation were listening to 'foreign stations' he is reported to have demanded that Radio 5 be 'fixed or shut'.

In 1985 Russell presented a radical and far-reaching plan and was appointed to Programme Director to implement it. He was given a six-month window with his only constraint being 'Don't breach the Broadcast Act.'

He immediately began sweeping changes, determined to programme for the listener, not the management. This included:

 English as the primary broadcast language
 Best jocks were dismissed and re-engaged on a year's freelance contract with shows named for and designed by them. 
 The music playlist was determined with direct input from the jocks
 Commercial scheduling was overhauled to be less intrusive
 Specialised evening shows were launched to combat television (best remembered for Chris Prior - the Rock Professor')
 Championed FM Stereo (eventually taken nationwide)
 Broadcasts extended into non-stop (24/7)
 Re-branded as 5FM with a one-word slogan 'Outrageous!'
 Introduced the first Talk Show on a Music Station (Chuckle and Chat)

The live phone-in Chuckle and Chat Show, presented by David Blood and Tony Sanderson became the most popular property on the air with listenership peaking at around 1 million nightly.

Russell made the presenters responsible for their own success or failure with the promise that, when their year's contract expired they would be free to renegotiate based on the audience the shows delivered.  (The legend is that he told the jocks "if your listenership is up at the end of the year I expect to hear from you. If they're down, expect to hear from me!") At the end of the first 12 months with an unheard of growth in loyal listeners, no-one lost their jobs.

However, Russell remained on salary and sought to negotiate the same performance-based contract for himself. Senior management rejected the proposal and Russell resigned to begin his own company, the Broadcast Development Group. (He was later to be contracted to assist the now ailing Radio 702 in its very successful repositioning and transition to 702 Talk Radio).

Former Presenters

 Mark Gillman
 Alex Jay
 Kevin Savage
 Brian Oxley
 Rafe Lavine
 Tony Blewitt
 Tich Mataz
 Ian F (Also Hosted the 5fm Top 40 with Sasha Martinengo)
 Sasha Martinengo (Also hosted the 5fm Top 40 with Ian F - Longest on air DJ - 20 years)
 Darren Scott (Drive time with John Walland, Ray White and Leigh-Ann Mol (née Van der Stadt)
 Mark Pilgrim with Ray White (Weekend Breakfast Show)
 Cleone Cassidy
 Ursula Stapelfeldt (Host of the World Chart Show)
 Sami Sabiti (Host of the World Chart Show)
 Koula (Host of the World Chart Show)
 Nicole Fox
 Zuraida Jardine
 Gareth Cliff
 Derek the Bandit
 Barney Simon
 Phil Wright
 Christina Knight (Knight School The Really Early Morning Show on Weekends)
 Roger Goode
 Thando Thabethe
 Ms Cosmo
 DJ Fresh (South African DJ)

5FM On-Air Shows

Breakfast Shows 

The Mark Gillman show was hosted by Mark Gillman and supported by Kevin Fine and Ruben Goldberg, Catherine Strydom (Grenfell) and stuntman "DangerBoy". Gillman was best known for his loud personality, and ability to wake people up with his high energy. His slogan "I Love it in the Mornings" was an effective mantra for people looking to start their days off on a positive note.

After a brief stint as the host of the drive-time show, Gareth Cliff replaced Gillman as 5fm's Breakfast Show host. With Cliff as the host, the show was supported by Leigh-Ann Mol on News, Mabale Moloi on traffic & Sias DuPlessis on Sport, with the production team featuring Damon Kalvari (Assistant to the Producer), and Thabo Modisane (Executive Producer). The show ended in 2014 when Cliff began an online radio platform, to which all of his team, save DuPlessis & Modisane, followed him.

Following Cliff's departure in 2014, DJ Fresh took over the morning show, having hosted the drive-time show since 2003. He was joined by Carmen Reddy on News, Duran Collett on Sports News, Sol Phenduka (and later Nonala Tose) on Traffic. On 31 March 2017, Fresh left 5FM for sister station, Metro FM.

He was replaced by Roger Goode, who hosted the show alongside Robbie Kruse on Sports, Sureshnie Rieder on News and Zanele Potelwa (nicknamed 'Young Boomerang') on traffic.

As of May 2021, former Good Hope FM host Dan Corder took over the Breakfast Show, joined by Thabo Baloyi on News, Xoli Zondo on Sports and Marli van Eeden on Traffic.

Weekday Mid-Morning Shows 

5FM has had an array of talent in its weekday mid-morning slots, including Rob Vember, Poppy Ntshongwana and prior to their Drive Shows, Thando Thabethe & Nick Hamman.

In May 2020, Msizi James and Stephanie Be paired up to present the Mid Mornings on 5 show during the brunchtime slot. Upon James’ departure for Johannesburg-based rival station 947, Stephanie hosts the brunchtime show alone.

Rob Forbes & Fix Moeti, one of South Africa's leading radio duos, hosted the wildly popular Forbes&Fix show during the lunchtime slot, with Kim Schulze on News. In 2021, they left radio, and the lunchtime show was taken over by Zanele Potelwa, with Yanga Mjoli on News.

Drive Time Shows 

Until 2014, DJ Fresh hosted "The Fresh Drive" alongside Catherine Grenfell, Poppy Ntshongwana, Duran Collett & Carmen Reddy. They were replaced by longtime host Roger Goode, joined by Ms Cosmo, Sureshnie Rieder & Sias du Plessis, who was later replaced by Robbie Kruse.

In 2017, Thando Thabethe became the station's first woman to host the Drive Time show. The Thabooty Drive featured Durbanite Msizi James as the co-host, Sibaphiwe Matiyela (and later, Nadia Romanos) on News and Duran Collett on Sports. She later resigned in 2020.

In May 2020, Nick Hamman, who had previously hosted the Hamman Time show during the mid-morning slot, took over as the host of 5Drive. He is joined by his producer, Mad Money Mike, and the on-air team of Nadia Romanos on News, Bibi Mbangula on Traffic and Jude van Wyk on Sports.

Weekday Evening & Night Programming 

As opposed to regular weekday programming, the Evening & Nighttime shows air from Monday to Thursday.

The evening show, 5Nights is hosted by Smash Afrika from 19:00 - 22:00.

The late night show, 5 after hours with Leah Jazz is hosted by Leah Jazz.

Weekend Breakfast Shows 

Before 2019, the Weekend Breakfast show, A Cuppa JT was hosted by Justin Toerien, with Nadia Romanos & Jude van Wyk on News & Sports respectively.

In April 2019, Nicole da Silva took over the reins of the weekend morning slot, naming the show 5FM Xtra Loud Mornings. She is joined by Sibaphiwe Matiyela on News and Duran Collett on Sports.

As of May 2022 KZN born Minnie Ntuli from East Coast radio joined the national youth Radio station doing weekend breakfast show with Monique DE Villiers on News and Aaron masemola on sports

Weekend Shows 

Sticking to their focus on music, the youth-aimed radio station delivers a musically-centred offering throughout the weekend (Fri-Sun). Hosts of these shows include the 5FM Weekender5 who deliver shows heavily centred on music, like Kid Fonque, das kapital and Kyle Cassim among others.

Nick Archibald anchors the 5FM Top 40 Chart show every Saturday and the 5FM Request Takeover show on Sundays.

2021 saw the introduction of campus radio talents Keabetswe Boya & Retshepile Seakamela from Tuks FM, and Boipelo Mooketsi, a VoW (Voice of Wits) alumna. They took on the Afternoon, Early Breakfast and Evening slots on the weekends respectively.

Early Morning Programming 

The Early Morning slots, known as "graveyard" slots, air between 01:00 and 06:00 on weekdays, & between 01:00 and 07:00 on weekends.

Until 2021, 5FM had round-the-clock broadcasting. The station is now automated with music between 01:00 and 04:00 on weekdays, and between 01:00 and 05:00 on weekends. The only early morning programming exists with the station's Early Breakfast shows, hosted by Karabo Ntshweng between Monday and Friday (between 04:00 and 06:00), and by Tshepi Seakamela on Saturdays and Sundays (between 05:00 and 07:00).

Listenership figures

References

External links
5FM Website

Radio stations in Johannesburg
Radio stations established in 1975